Writer is the debut studio album by American singer-songwriter Carole King, released in May 1970. King already had a successful career as a songwriter, and been a part of The City, a short-lived group she formed after moving to Los Angeles in 1968. Tracks on the album include "Up on the Roof" which was a number 4 hit for the Drifters in 1962, and "Child of Mine", which has been recorded by Billy Joe Royal, among others. The album did not receive much attention upon its release, though it entered the chart following the success of King's next album, Tapestry, in 1971. It was produced by John Fischbach, the co-founder of Crystal Sound studio where the album was recorded. 

The album received positive reviews from critics, with AllMusic noting that it was the "most underrated of all [her] original albums".  And, in a review that also covered Tapestry in Rolling Stone, Jon Landau wrote, "Writer was a blessing despite its faults" and that though the "production was poor", King herself made the album "very worthwhile".

Track listing
All songs written by Gerry Goffin and Carole King; lyrics for "Raspberry Jam" and "What Have You Got to Lose" by Toni Stern.
Side one
"Spaceship Races" – 3:09
"No Easy Way Down" – 4:36
"Child of Mine" – 4:05
"Goin' Back" – 3:20
"To Love" – 3:39
"What Have You Got to Lose" – 3:33
Side two
"Eventually" – 5:01
"Raspberry Jam" – 4:35
"Can't You Be Real" – 3:00
"I Can't Hear You No More" – 2:46
"Sweet Sweetheart" – 2:46
"Up on the Roof" – 3:37

Personnel
Carole Kingpiano, vocals, backing vocals, arrangements
Ralph Schuckettorgan
John FischbachMoog synthesizer
James Tayloracoustic guitar; backing vocals on "Goin' Back"
Danny Kortchmaracoustic guitar, electric guitar, conga
Charles LarkeyFender bass
Joel O'Briendrums, percussion, vibes
Abigale Haness, Delores Hallbacking vocals

Production
John Fischbachproducer
Andrew Berlinerengineer
Gerry Goffinmixing
Guy Webstercover photograph
Tom Neuwirthliner photographs
Rod Dyer, Paul Bruhwilerlayout, design

Charts

References

1970 debut albums
Carole King albums
CBS Records albums
Ode Records albums